Pashtun cuisine refers to the cuisine of the Pashtun people and is covered under both Afghan and Pakistani cuisines. It is largely based on meat dishes including mutton, beef, chicken, and fish as well as rice and some other vegetables. Accompanying these staples are dairy products (yogurt, whey, cheeses), various nuts, local vegetables, and fresh and dried fruits. Peshawar, Kabul, Kandahar, Quetta and Islamabad are centers of Pashtun cuisine.

Popular food items

The following is an incomplete list of food items that Pashtuns enjoy eating. 
 Afghan burger
 Aush (hand made noodles)
 Aushak (vegetable and chive-filled dumplings topped with tomato and yogurt sauces)
 Bolani, also called Piraki in some parts of Afghanistan
 Badenjan (cooked eggplant in oil with potatoes and tomatoes)
 Bhindi (cooked okra in oil with potatoes and tomatoes)
 Biryani
 Chapli kabab
 Chopan Kabab (lamb chops, skewered and grilled on charcoal)
 Dodai (a flat bread made in vertical clay ovens called Tanoor in Pashto, Tandoor in Urdu/Hindi)
 Shomleh/Shlombeh, also known as "Triwai" in Kabul (a drink made by mixing yogurt with water and shaking it extensively before adding optional dried mint leaves and a small amount of salt)
 Fried fish with Kachumar Raita (diced onion, tomatoes, cucumbers in Masteh/Dahi) and naan
 Ghatay Rujay, Ghatay Wrejay (literally "fat rice"; a rice dish resembling risotto prepared in Charsadda, Mardan, Pirpiai, and other villages of the region where short grain brown rice is grown)
 Kabuli palaw
 Kaddo Borwani (sweet pumpkins)
 Kichrei (sticky rice with mung beans and onions topped with melted qurot sauce, mostly eaten during winter)
 Londei, also known as Tarshay (lamb or beef jerky cooked with rice)
 Pikora/Pakora
 Paratha
 Pekhteh or Pukhtay (beef/mutton ribs)
 Naray ghwakha (mutton, mutton dish)
 Seekh kabab (beef/mutton/chicken)
 Shinwari tikka (roasted lamb)
 Shorwa (soup)
 Mantu (meat dumplings, usually served under a yogurt-based white sauce)
 Masteh (freshly made yogurt)
 Rosh (cooked lamb and mutton with no spices)

Traditional breakfast items
Pashtuns in their traditional territory drink green or black tea (chai) with breakfast. Some drink masala chai, especially the Pakistani Pashtuns. Sheer chai, which is a type of tea that is mixed with milk and sugar is also consumed. Other breakfast foods can include: Afghan naan, paratha, eggs, butterfat, milk creams, cheeses, etc. Pastries, cakes and cookies are consumed with either tea or warm milk. Those in cities buy and eat whatever breakfast items are sold in grocery stores, which may include porridge, oatmeal, cereal, pancakes, sausages, fruit juices, etc.

See also

Afghan cuisine
Pashtun culture
Pakistani cuisine

References

External links

 
Afghan cuisine
Pakistani cuisine
South Asian cuisine
Pashtun culture
Cuisine by ethnicity